Jazmurian Rural District is a rural district (dehestan) in Jazmurian District, Rudbar-e Jonubi County, Kerman Province, Iran. At the 2006 census, its population was 32,020, in 6,335 families. The rural district has 132 villages.

References 

Rural Districts of Kerman Province
Rudbar-e Jonubi County